Benton Township is a township in Wayne County, Iowa, USA.

History
Benton Township is named for Missouri statesman Thomas Hart Benton.

References

Townships in Wayne County, Iowa
Townships in Iowa